Pudr a benzín is a Czech comedy film. It was released in 1931.

External links
 

1931 films
1931 comedy films
Czechoslovak comedy films
Czechoslovak black-and-white films
1930s Czech films